Agrippina is an ancient Roman cognomen and a given name. 

Agrippina may also refer to:
 Agrippina (opera), an opera by George Frideric Handel
 Agrippina (film), a 1911 Italian film
 645 Agrippina, an asteroid

See also
 
Insects:
 Catocala agrippina
 Thysania agrippina
 Synechodes agrippina
 Midila agrippina
 Pseudaletis agrippina
 Villa agrippina